Electrical tape (or insulating tape) is a type of pressure-sensitive tape used to insulate electrical wires and other materials that conduct electricity. It can be made of many plastics, but PVC (polyvinyl chloride, "vinyl") is most popular, as it stretches well and gives an effective and long lasting insulation. Electrical tape for class H insulation is made of fiberglass cloth.

Varieties 

A wide variety of electrical tapes is available, some for highly specialized purposes. "The primary tapes used in electrical applications are vinyl, rubber, mastic, and varnished cambric." Electricians generally use only white transparent tape for insulation purposes. The other colors are used to indicate the voltage level and phase of the wire (colored tape sometimes is called "phasing tape"). This is done on large wire which is available only in black insulation. When wires are phased, a ring of tape is placed on each end near the termination so that the purpose of the wire is obvious. The following table(s) describe the use of electrical tape.

Tape that is approved for electrical applications will carry an approval label from an agency such as  Underwriters Laboratories.

History 

Today, electrical tape is simply "another form of insulation". The original electrical insulating tape was made of cloth tape impregnated with Chatterton's compound, an adhesive material manufactured using Gutta-percha. This type of tape was often used to insulate soldered splices on knob and tube wiring.  It was commonly referred to as "friction tape", and had the unique property of being sticky on both sides.  Because of this, no matter how it was used it stuck to itself very readily.

In the early 1940s, vinyl plastic emerged as a versatile material for a wide range of applications, from shower curtains to cable insulation. A major ingredient in vinyl film was tricresyl phosphate (TCP), which was used as a plasticizer. Unfortunately, TCP tended to migrate, giving the surface of the vinyl film an oily quality and degrading every tape adhesive known. Research chemists and engineers at 3M set out to create a dependable, pressure-sensitive tape made of vinyl film that would have the required electrical, physical and chemical properties.

Experiments were conducted combining new plasticizers with the white, flour-like vinyl resin. Finally, in January 1946, inventors Snell, Oace, and Eastwold of 3M applied for a patent for a vinyl electrical tape with a plasticizer system and non-sulfur-based rubber adhesive that were compatible. The first commercially available version of the tape was sold for use as a wire-harness wrapping. This original electrical tape wasn't black. Tapes formulated for high-temperature were yellow, and later versions were white. Electrically insulating tapes are essential for enhancing functionality and reliability in a wide range of applications. Some of the most popular types include electrically insulating adhesive tape and electrically insulating film, both of which provide reliable electronic isolation and ensure that direct electrical connection is not made between two or more circuits or their adjacent parts. There is also electrically conducting tape for shielding and similar applications. White tape, because of its instability in ultraviolet light, was eventually replaced with black tape, although colored vinyl tapes are still used as identification and marking tapes. Black became the standard industry color for vinyl standard tape, primarily because of its ultraviolet resistance. Thicknesses originally were 4 mil (100 µm), 8 mil (200 µm) and 12 mil (300 µm). These were standardized to 7 mil (180 µm) and 10 mil (250 µm) in 1948.

See also 
 List of adhesive tapes
 Friction tape

References

External links

 Electrical Taping Skills: A Lost Art?
 Electrical Tape Tips by KØFF
ASTM D1000 - Test methods for electrical tapes

Adhesive tape
Dielectrics